Eosentomon carpaticum is a species of proturan in the family Eosentomidae. It is found in Europe and Northern Asia (excluding China).

References

Eosentomon
Articles created by Qbugbot
Animals described in 1985